Delisting may refer to:

Delisting (Canadian medicare), the removal of medical coverage for a certain operation by  Canadian medicare
Delisting, the removal of a product from the list of those sold by a particular retailer
Delisting, the removal of protected status from a formerly Listed building
Delisting, the removal of a stock from a stock exchange; see Listing (finance)